Haruichi is a Japanese given name. Notable people with the name include:

 , Japanese manga artist
 , Japanese musician

Japanese masculine given names